From Newport to London: Greatest Hits Live ... and More is the second live album by Polish-born singer Basia, released in September 2011 by eOne Music.

Overview
The album consists of 15 songs recorded live in Klub Wytwórnia in Łódź, Poland, on 29 June 2011, and three bonus studio tracks. Of the live tracks, six were originally recorded for her 1987 debut album, Time and Tide ("How Dare You", "Astrud", "New Day for You", "From Now On", "Promises", and "Time and Tide"), two from her 1990 release London Warsaw New York ("Cruising for Bruising" and "Copernicus"), three from the 1994 album The Sweetest Illusion ("Third Time Lucky", "Drunk on Love", and "An Olive Tree"), and four from her 2009 album It's That Girl Again ("If Not Now Then When", "Love Lies Bleeding", "I Must", and "A Gift"). The latter is a duet with Ada Szulc, one of the contestants of the Polish edition of X Factor, with whom Basia had performed this song live on the show several weeks earlier. Of the three studio recordings, "There's a Tear" is an acoustic remake of a song that originally appeared on It's That Girl Again. The remaining two tracks are original to this album, including "Wandering", a duet with Polish singer   .

The title song was inspired by Basia's love for European film music and the world of art. The lyrics tell "the story of falling in love with a stranger on the train" and were written during a train journey from New York to Boston in June 2010 when Basia was on her US tour. The track was released as a digital single in August 2011. The album premiered in the United States on 13 September 2011. In Poland, it was released on 14 October 2011. "Wandering" received radio airplay in Poland in early 2012.

Track listing

Personnel
Basia – lead vocals
Danny White – keyboards
Paul Booth – flute (alto), percussion, saxophone, background vocals
Veronique Clarisse – background vocals
Annick Clarisse-Willequet – background vocals
Andy Lafone – bass 
Marc Parnell – drums 
Kevin Robinson – flugelhorn, percussion, trumpet, background vocals
Giorgio Serci – guitar
Mietek Szcześniak – guest vocals
Ada Szulc – guest vocals

Charts

References

External links
 The official Basia website
 From Newport to London: Greatest Hits Live ... and More on Discogs

2011 live albums
Basia live albums
E1 Music live albums

pl:From Newport to London: Greatest Hits Live... and More